United Nations Security Council Resolution 46, adopted on April 17, 1948, having referenced the goals of United Nations Security Council Resolution 43 and noting that the United Kingdom was still the Mandatory Power in charge of the Palestinian territory, it was responsible for ending the conflict there and every member of the Council was due to aid it achieve such a peace.

With that in mind it called on both the Arab Higher Committee and the Jewish Agency to immediately cease all acts of violence, to stop outside combatants from entering the territory, stop importing weapons, refrain from any immediate political activity which might later prejudice the rights or claims of any community, cooperate with the British authorities and refrain from any actions which might endanger the safety of any of the Holy Places in the territory.  The resolution further called upon all the countries of the region to cooperate in any way they could, particularly enforcing the movement of fighters or arms into the territory.

The resolution was adopted by nine votes to none, with abstentions from the Ukrainian SSR and Soviet Union.

See also
List of United Nations Security Council Resolutions 1 to 100 (1946–1953)
United Nations Security Council Resolution 48
United Nations Security Council Resolution 49
United Nations Security Council Resolution 50

References
Text of the Resolution at undocs.org

External links
 

 0046
 0046
Mandatory Palestine
 0046
April 1948 events